The Nyasa are a people of southeastern Africa, concentrated mainly in Malawi, southwestern Tanzania and parts of northern Mozambique. The people are also known as the Kimanda, Kinyasa and Manda. Significant populations of Nyasa live along the shores of northeastern Lake Malawi.
Many Nyanja people of Malawi refers to themselves as Nyasa; as of 2010 roughly 500,000 claim to be Nyasa people.

See also
Nyasaland
Lake Nyasa

References

Ethnic groups in Malawi
Ethnic groups in Tanzania